Farafenni or Farafegni is a town in the Gambia, lying on the Trans-Gambia Highway in the North Bank Division, just south of the border with Senegal. It is an important market town.

The population of Farafenni is around 25,000 and the main local language is Wolof, although Mandinka, Fula and other languages are also fairly common.

Farafenni is the site of a recently built hospital and also contains a military base which was attacked in 1995 by six men later claiming to be Sanyang's collaborators.

It is sometimes called Chakubanta or Faracity.

There is only one senior secondary school, called: Farafenni Senior Secondary School; two junior Secondary: Farafenni Junior Secondary School, and Anglican Junior Secondary School. Both located in the Outskirts of the town; and two primary Schools, namely: Farafenni Lower Basic School, and Mauritani Lower Basic School. Farafenni Upper Basic School is sponsored by John Cabot Academy in Bristol, UK.

Farafenni is a commercial town, were transactions are carried out in various commercial sectors. It has one big market situated opposite Farafenni Gamtel, and nearby there are shops and a small market on Kerewan Highway. Both markets serve the needs of the inhabitants. There is also a weekly market called lumo. The lumo place is located at the outskirts of the town, adjacent to the Farafenni Stadium.

Farafenni is at the northern end of the segment of the Trans-Gambia Highway containing the Senegambia Bridge.

References

North Bank Division
Populated places in the Gambia
The Gambia–Senegal border crossings